Sacraboar is a capture the flag style real-time strategy video game developed by Makivision Games for Windows. The game was released on November 6, 2009.

Gameplay
The goal of the game is to capture the enemy BOAR trophy and return it to your base while you still control your own BOAR trophy. There are seven different units available, which all play different roles. One unit is a builder unit that can transform into tower which will either give you spells to cast on units or more resources to buy units.

References

2009 video games
Multiplayer and single-player video games
Real-time strategy video games
Video games about pigs
Windows games